Powerline may refer to:

Technology
 Overhead power line, used for electric power transmission
 Power-line communication, a computer networking technology
 Powerline, a status line plugin for vim and other application; see Private Use Areas

Music and media
 Powerline (magazine), an American music magazine and website
 Power Line, a political blog
 "Power Lines", a 2016 single by TIGRESS
 "Power Lines", a 2012 song by Reks from Straight, No Chaser
 Powerline, a fictional singer in the A Goofy Movie musical

Sport
Powerlines F.C., South African soccer club